This is a list of Roman governors of Germania Inferior (and Germania Secunda from 395 until the deposition of Romulus Augustulus in 476). Capital and largest city of Germania Inferior was Colonia Claudia Ara Agrippinensium (CCAA), modern-day Cologne.

Governors during the Principate

BC 27 – AD 68: Julio-Claudian dynasty 

   12–9 BC:  Nero Claudius Drusus
     9–8 BC: Tiberius
     4–1 BC: Lucius Domitius Ahenobarbus
 AD     1–4: Marcus Vinicius
 AD     4–6: Tiberius (again)
 AD     7–9: Publius Quinctilius Varus
 AD   9–11: Tiberius (again)
 AD 12–14: Germanicus Caesar
 AD 14–16: Aulus Caecina Severus
 AD     21: Gaius Silius
 AD     21: Gaius Visellius Varro
 AD 28–34: Lucius Apronius
 AD 34–39: unknown
 AD 40–41: Aulus Gabinius Secundus
 AD 46–47: Quintus Sanquinius Maximus
 AD 47–51: Gnaeus Domitius Corbulo
 AD 51–54: unknown
 AD 54–58: Pompeius Paullinus
 AD 58–60: Lucius Duvius Avitus
 AD 63–67: Publius Sulpicius Scribonius Rufus
 AD 67–68: Gaius Fonteius Capito
 AD 68–69: Aulus Vitellius Germanicus

AD 69–96: Year of the Four Emperors and Flavian dynasty 

 AD 69–70: Gaius Dillius Vocula (?)
 AD 70–71: Quintus Petillius Cerialis
 AD 71–73: Aulus Marius Celsus
 AD 73–78: Lucius Acilius Strabo
 AD     78: Gaius Rutilius Gallicus
 AD 78–80: Decimus Iunius Novius Priscus
 AD 80–83: Sextus Julius Frontinus (?)
 AD 87–89: Aulus Bucius Lappius Maximus
 AD 91–96: Marcus Ulpius Trajanus

AD 96–192: Nervan-Antonian dynasty 

 AD     96–97: Marcus Ulpius Trajanus
 AD         97: Titus Vestricius Spurinna (?)
 AD     97–98: Lucius Licinius Sura
 AD     98–99: Lucius Neratius Priscus
 AD   99–100: unknown
 AD 101–102: Quintus Acutius Nerva
 AD 103–116: unknown
 AD 117–119: Aulus Platorius Nepos Manilianus Gaius Licinius Pollio
 AD 122–129: unknown
 AD 127: Lucius Coelius Rufus
 AD 130–13?: Granius [Fabianus] Grattius [Cerealis?] Geminius
 AD 135–139: Quintus Lollius Urbicus
 AD 140–142: unknown
 AD 142–150: Gaius Julius Severus
 AD 150–151: Publius Septimius Aper (?)
 AD 151–152: Lucius Octavius Cornelius Salvius Iulianus Aemillianus
 AD 152–158: Gnaeus Julius Verus
 AD       158: Sextus Calpurnius Agricola (?)
 AD 158–160: Tiberius Claudius Julianus
 AD 15?–161: Salvius Julianus (?)
 AD 161–16?: Gaius Septimius Severus
 AD 170–17?: Quintus Antistius Adventus
 AD 17?–180: Junius Macr[er] (?)
 AD 180–185: Marcus Didius Julianus
 AD 18?–192: Gaius Allius Fuscus

AD 193–235: Year of the Five Emperors & Severan dynasty 

 AD 193–197: Virius Lupus
 AD 197–19?: Gaius Valerius Pudens
 AD 199–20?: Novius Priscus
 AD 201–204: Marius Maximus Perpetuus Aurelianus
 AD       205: Quintus Venidius Rufus
 AD 20?–20?: Quintus Tarquitius Catulus
 AD 206–210: Gnaeus Fulvius Maximus Centumalus
 AD 211–212: Lucius Lucceius Martinus
 AD 212–21?: Marcius Claudius Agrippa
 AD 216–21?: Marcus Valerius Senecio
 AD 222–22?: Flavius Aper Commodianus
 AD 230–231: Clodius Aurelius Saturninus
 AD       231: Flavius Janus
 AD 23?–235: Gaius Messius Quintus Decius

AD 235–285: Emperors during the Crisis of the Third Century 

 AD 23?–23?: Iasdius Domitianus (?)
 AD 233–238: Gaius Furius Sabinus Aquila Timesitheus
 AD 238–24?: Lucius Domitius Gallicanus Papinianus
 AD       25?: Quintus Tarquinius Catulus
 AD 259–260: Marcus Cassianus Postumus
 AD 260–274: (!) Gallic Empire
 Marcus Cassianus Postumus
 Marcus Aurelius Marius
 Victorinus
 Tetricus I / Tetricus II
 AD 274:

See also 
 List of Frankish kings
 List of bishops and archbishops of Cologne
 Römisch-Germanisches Museum

References 

 Werner Eck (de): Die Statthalter der germanischen Provinzen vom 1.–3. Jahrhundert, Rheinland-Verlag, Köln, 1985

Germania Inferior
Cologne-related lists
Germania Inferior
!